Chambers was a ship launched in Bristol in 1776. She spent most of her brief career as a West Indiaman. An American privateer captured her in October 1782 in a single ship action.

Career
Chambers first appeared in Lloyd's Register in 1776.

The British Admiralty gave notice in April 1777, that they were ready to issue letters of marque for privateers against the Americans. In March 1778, Great Britain broke off relations with France. Captain Abraham Frizwell acquired a letter of marque on 28 September 1778.

Chambers arrived at Jamaica in May 1779. On her way she captured a brig sailing from St Domingo to Bordeaux, which Chambers sent into New York. She set into Jamaica a schooner that was carrying rum and molasses, and a sloop into New Providence. Chambers had also repelled an attack by two American privateers, one of 16 and the other of 12 guns. The encounter had take place in the Gulf of Florida and lasted two hours before the Americans broke it off.

Captain John Langley acquired a letter of marque on 28 August 1779.

Lloyd's List reported in March 1780 that Chambers, Langley, master, and Lord North, Webb, master, had brought an American privateer with them into Barbados.

A gale between 1 and 2 August 1781 drove Chambers, Langley, master, and some other vessels on shore at Jamaica. She was gotten off and on 20 April 1782 sailed for Quebec, which she reached.

Loss
On 7 October 1782 the American privateer Buccaneer, of 22 guns, captured Chambers, Langley, master, off Cape Clear Island as Chambers was returning to Bristol from Quebec. Buccaneer sent Chambers to Lorient. Chambers'' only struck after an hour's engagement.

Notes

Citations

References
 
 

1776 ships
Ships built in Bristol
Age of Sail merchant ships of England
Captured ships